Banou Diawara (born 13 February 1992) is a Burkinabé footballer who plays for Ethiopian club Sebeta City. He plays primarily as a forward.

Club career
In January 2018, Diawara joined AS FAR, signing a two-year contract with the club.

International career

International goals
Scores and results list Burkina Faso's goal tally first.

Honours
 Burkinabé Premier League (1): 2014–15
 Burkinabé Premier League topscorer (2): 2013–14, 2014–15

References

External links
 
 
 

1992 births
Burkina Faso international footballers
Burkinabé expatriate footballers
Burkinabé footballers
Living people
RC Bobo Dioulasso players
JS Kabylie players
Smouha SC players
AS FAR (football) players
A.F.C. Tubize players
Algerian Ligue Professionnelle 1 players
Egyptian Premier League players
Burkinabé Premier League players
Challenger Pro League players
People from Bobo-Dioulasso
Association football forwards
2017 Africa Cup of Nations players
Expatriate footballers in Algeria
Expatriate footballers in Egypt
Expatriate footballers in Morocco
Expatriate footballers in Belgium
Expatriate footballers in Ethiopia
Burkinabé expatriate sportspeople in Algeria
Burkinabé expatriate sportspeople in Egypt
Burkinabé expatriate sportspeople in Morocco
Burkinabé expatriate sportspeople in Belgium
21st-century Burkinabé people